The Royal Masonic School for Girls (RMS) is a private school in Rickmansworth, Hertfordshire, England, with day and boarding pupils. The school was instituted in 1788, with the aim of caring for the daughters of poor Freemasons. In 1978, the school opened to girls beyond the daughters of freemasons.

The school opened in 1789 with fifteen pupils in Somers Town, St Pancras, Middlesex. The school has moved between premises three times, twice within London and in 1934 to Rickmansworth in Hertfordshire, where it still is today.

The Royal Masonic School for Girls is a day school for girls 4–18 and a boarding school for girls 7–18. A nursery opened in 2009 for boys and girls aged 2–4.

In the beginning
On 14 May 1788, a committee of Bartholomew Ruspini and nine other Freemasons met at the Freemasons' Tavern in Great Queen Street to plan the details of a charitable institution for the daughters of Masons who were struggling financially. A house at Somers Place East in Somers Town was taken in October as the premises of the institution at a rent of £35 per annum to house 15 children. The property has since disappeared but was between the present day Euston and St Pancras stations, near where the British Library is today.

Twenty replies for an advertisement for the matron were received, of which five were shortlisted. Ann Le Clerc was elected by ballot. She is referred to in the minutes of the meeting as a governess. It is unknown as to whether she was married or not.

On 5 January 1789, the children met at Ruspini's house and walked in procession to the house. The ceremonial procession was reported in the Morning Post (later to become absorbed by the Daily Telegraph) and the Daily Advertiser on 10 January.

The children could be from any part of the United Kingdom and had to be between the ages of six and nine. They had to be the daughters of Freemasons and were required to be in good health, having already had smallpox or cowpox and "be free from infirmity of deformity." At the end of their school life, girls were either returned to their family or supporters or apprenticed and supported until they could establish themselves.

Location
The original location of the house in Somers town became too small with the addition of five new pupils at the end of the first year and another five after that. By 1790, discussion of finding a bigger site had begun. It was decided that a new building would be built. The place for the new school was St George's Fields, that is today 28 Westminster Bridge Road.

St John's Hill, Battersea Rise was the school's third location, purchased in 1853. It is unclear whether the school was in Battersea, Clapham, Wandsworth, or Putney when its address was written down. The school was still expanding; and in 1918, the junior girls moved to a new junior school in Weybridge, Surrey.

John Leopold Denman, an architect from Brighton, won the commission to design the school.
Originally, the Rickmansworth site was just for the senior girls (aged 12 and above). In 1973, the junior school moved from Weybridge to join the senior school in Rickmansworth.

History

Food and clothing
A diet table was drawn up for the girls that was partly transcribed from other charities and partly based on the observations of Mr Boys, a governor and surgeon. The diet allowed a ration of 2 pounds of meat per child per week.

The war years

WWI

Life at the school continued pretty much as normal during the first world war. Two exceptions include an incident in 1917 where the school was damaged by anti-aircraft fire, and 1919 when the girls gave up their prizes on prize day so that the money could be given to charity.

WWII

In order to protect the girls from the expected aerial bombardment, an air raid shelter had been dug out. This was behind the boarding house formerly known as Ruspini and now known as Alexandra. The shelter was commonly referred to as the trenches and consisted of tunnels that zig-zagged with a room at intervals for boiling a kettle or dispensing medicines.

They also adopted 3 ships, including the Ocean Courier. The girls knitted socks, gloves, and other items which were sent to the ship at Christmas. In return, Captain Crastion, the ship's captain, sent the school 36 pounds of toffee. The captain visited the school, and he and his ship also took part in the action on D-Day, carrying men and munitions.

Headmasters & Mistresses

 Sarah Louisa Davis—Head Governess—1861–1896
 Emily Redgrave—Head Governess—1896–?
 Maria Elizabeth Flintoff – 1911
 Elizabeth Hutchinson—Head Governess
 Florence Mason—matron and headmistress of the junior school—1915–1935
 Bertha Dean—1915–1938
 Mary Calway—1938–1940
 Audrey E Fryer—1941–1959
 Una Jessie Campbell—1959–1972
 Miss Jean Thompson—1972–1980
 David Curtis—1980–1991
 Irene Andrews—1991–2001
 Diana Rose—2001–2017
Kevin Carson—2017–present

Film and TV
The school has been used as a filming location on a number of occasions for films and television, including Raiders of the Lost Ark, Supergirl, Indiana Jones and the Last Crusade and Me and Orson Welles. Others include the children's TV series The Demon Headmaster, Inspector Morse, and EastEnders. It was the venue for "Skate Camp" on CBBC show, Skate Nation and on the Kevin Bishop show for British High School Musical

RMS Traditions

The School Badge

Two pillars are at each side of the design of the school badge. A five-pointed star is in the centre. At the bottom of the new badge, and centre of the old badge is the "smooth Ashlar". At the top of the old badge are the letters R.M.I.G standing for Royal Masonic Institution for Girls. On the new badge is the school motto, Circumornatae ut similitudo templi, which is the Vulgate version of a phrase from Psalm 144:12: "That our daughters may be as the polished corners of the temple".

School Drill
Some of the school drill originates in Swedish Drill, and some is based on callisthenics. When exercising began to be incorporated into girls' education there were no trained women P.E. teachers, so drilling was under the guidance of an Army drill instructor. The marching, counter marching and arm stretches were considered the only exercise suitable for a young lady.

It is unclear when school drill began. In an extract from the school magazine Machio in 1962, school drill is purported to be a hundred years old. There is a reference to it in an account of prize day 1876 although it is not referred to as drill.

It was performed to music on a piano, later 2 grand pianos, and consisted of 180 girls (the number of degrees in a semicircle). In 1980, the music was recorded and the spoken commands gave way to a whistle. The girls learn their positions (based on their height, and thus changing from year to year and needing to be re-learned) and move in time to the music from one point to the next. The end of the performance is marked by the girls producing the Masonic emblem of set square and compass, and the point, the smallest child in the performance marching forward alone to complete the symbol.

Duos and Trios

Duos and Trios are a tradition upheld at prize day. 6 pianos in a row are played by either 2 (duos) or 3 (trios) girls simultaneously.

Ashlar

The Ashlar is the silver badge that RMS may achieve by the end of Year 11. The award of the Ashlar shows that a girl has been recognised for her contribution to school life, her sense of personal responsibility and her responsibility to others.

RMS Today

The school follows the UK national curriculum with students taking their GCSEs at age 16 and A-Levels at 18.

Although girls of any religion are invited to attend, the school is based upon the Church of England and girls attend chapel assemblies once a week in the afternoon. A Chapel service is also held on Sundays for the boarders.

Notable former pupils

Amelia Warner, actress
Hebe Elsna, author 
Wendy Richard, actress

See also
Masonic Female Orphan School of Ireland

References

External links
The Royal Masonic School for Girls
The Royal Masonic Trust for Boys and Girls
video A short film about a mother, terrified by her daughters imaginary friends. She seeks help at a Psychiatrist only to unravel the truth of her own life. Filmed at RMS by some students.
Extracts from Barbara Kelland's Book

Schools in Three Rivers District
Private schools in Hertfordshire
Girls' schools in Hertfordshire
Boarding schools in Hertfordshire
Freemasonry in England
Educational institutions established in 1788
Masonic educational institutions in the United Kingdom
1788 establishments in England
Rickmansworth